Phostria oajacalis is a moth in the family Crambidae. It was described by Francis Walker in 1866. It is found in Nicaragua, Guatemala, Costa Rica., Mexico and the southern United States.

References

Phostria
Moths described in 1866
Moths of North America